Carlos César Matheus or simply Carlinhos (born August 2, 1984 in Taquaritinga), is a Brazilian defensive midfielder who currently plays for Bragantino. He spent most of his career in Brazil, playing for América-SP, São Paulo, Guarani and Figueirense before, in January 2010, moving to Greek Superleague club Iraklis.

Club

Brazil
Carlinhos started his carre in the youth ranks of Flamengo. He has played professional football for América-SP, São Paulo, Guarani and Figueirense.

Iraklis
On 26 January 2010, he signed a 1.5-years contract with Iraklis. Carlnhos debuted for Giraios 14 February 2010, in an away 0-0 draw against Panionios, as he came in as an 81st-minute substitute for Panagiotis Kone. Until the end of the season he played in 5 more matches, to reach a total of six appearances in his first season for the club. He was a starter for Iraklis in the club's first match for the 2010-2011 season, a 2-1 win versus Olympiacos. He continued appearing almost regularly for Iraklis throughout the season, but in January he sustained a groin injury.

Achievements
São Paulo
Campeonato Paulista (1): 2005
Figueirense
Campeonato Catarinense (1): 2008

References

External links
Profile at Iraklis Official website 
sambafoot 
CBF 
figueirense.com 

1984 births
América Futebol Clube (SP) players
Brazilian footballers
Brazilian expatriate footballers
CR Flamengo footballers
Expatriate footballers in Greece
Figueirense FC players
Guarani FC players
Clube Atlético Bragantino players
Iraklis Thessaloniki F.C. players
Living people
São Paulo FC players
Super League Greece players
Association football midfielders
People from Taquaritinga